The Dark Room is a 2018 Iranian drama directed, written and produced by Rouhollah Hejazi. 

The subject of this film is the persecution and rape of children in Iran.

Hejazi went to the thirty-sixth Fajr Film Festival with The Dark Room three years after his latest release, Death of the Fish. 

It won Best Film at the Hanoi International Film Festival and at the Film Festival of Kerala in 2018. It was the only representative of Iran at the Belgrade Film Festival in 2019.

Plot
Farhad and Haleh and their four-years-old son Amir, move into a new housing complex. One day, Amir gets lost in the desert in front of the complex. His parents find him, but Amir seems upset and Farhad suspects that someone has abused his son.

Cast
Saed Soheili as Farhad
Sareh Bayat as Haleh
 Alireza Mirsalari as Amir
 Morvarid Kashian as Pegah
 Amir Reza Ranjbaran as Peyman

Accolades

References

External links 
 

2018 films
2010s Persian-language films
Iranian drama films
2018 drama films